Masoller is a village or populated centre of the Rivera Department in northern Uruguay, next to the de facto border with Brazil, in an area where that border is disputed.

Geography
The village is located on Route 30, on the tripoint with Salto and Artigas departments, in the municipality of Tranqueras.

History

In 1904 a notable battle was fought at Masoller between the opposing forces of the Colorados, led by José Batlle y Ordóñez, and the Blancos, led by Aparicio Saravia, resulting in a victory for the former. The Battle of Masoller is reckoned to mark the end of the intermittent civil war which occurred throughout much of 19th century Uruguay.

Uruguayan-Brazilian border dispute
A longstanding border dispute involving territory in the vicinity of Masoller exists between Uruguay and Brazil, although this has not harmed close diplomatic and economic relations between the two countries; Brazil and Uruguay have not actively asserted overt measures to reinforce their respective claims to the area such as by sending troops to the vicinity. The disputed area is called Rincón de Artigas, and the dispute arises from the fact that the treaty that delimited the Brazil-Uruguay border in 1851 determined that the border in that area would be a creek called Arroyo de la Invernada, but the two countries disagree on which actual stream is the so-named one.

So far, Rincón de Artigas is effectively under Brazilian control. The village of Masoller itself is in undisputed Uruguayan territory, just a few hundred metres from the largely unmarked and unimpeded de facto international border.

Population
In 2011 Masoller had a population of 240.
 
Source: Instituto Nacional de Estadística de Uruguay

See also
 José Batlle y Ordóñez
 Aparicio Saravia
 Rivera Department
 Tranqueras - city to which Masoller administratively belongs.
 Brazilian Island - another disputed area between Uruguay and Brazil.

References

Chasteen, John Charles; 'Heroes on Horseback: A Life and Times of the Last Gaucho Caudillos', University of New Mexico Press, 1995

External links
INE map of Masoller

Populated places in the Rivera Department
Borders of Brazil
Borders of Uruguay
Brazil–Uruguay border
Territorial disputes of Brazil
Territorial disputes of Uruguay